Reyna was a 74-gun ship of the line of the Spanish Navy, launched in 1743.

She was captured by the Royal Navy on 13 August 1762, and commissioned as the third rate HMS Reyna. She was sold out of the navy in 1772.

See also
List of ships captured in the 18th century

Notes

References

Lavery, Brian (2003) The Ship of the Line - Volume 1: The development of the battlefleet 1650-1850. Conway Maritime Press. .

Reyna (1743)
Ships of the line of the Royal Navy
1743 ships
Captured ships